The Order of Agricultural Merit is an order of merit bestowed by the French Republic for outstanding contributions to agriculture. When it was created in 1883, it was second in importance only to the Legion of Honour within the French order of precedence.

History
The order was established on 7 July 1883, based on the proposition of the then Minister of Agriculture Jules Méline, in an effort to adequately reward services to agriculture in view of the maximum number of the Legion of Honour that could be awarded yearly. His reasoning was that more than eighteen million Frenchmen lived directly from this industry, which had a direct and powerful impact on the entire national economy (farmers, agronomists, professors, researchers, etc.). Labour was intensive and never ending, devotion was commonplace but the rewards were rare.

The original 1883 decree created a single-grade order; only "Knights" were thus decorated.  The decree of 18 June 1887 added the grade of "Officer". A third grade, that of "Commander", was created by a decree of 3 August 1900.  The present form and statute of the Order of Agricultural Merit were outlined in decree 59-729 of 15 June 1959.

The Order comprises approximately 340,000 recipients to date, of which approximately 23,000 are alive at any given time, including all living former ministers of agriculture. Officers number approximately 60,000 to date with approximately 5,000 living, and approximately 4800 were made commanders to date, with approximately 400 living at any given time.

Award statute
The Order of Agricultural Merit rewards people who rendered exceptional services to agriculture, whether in public duties or in the very practice of agriculture. It also rewards people who distinguished themselves in scientific research or in related publications. There are two annual investiture ceremonies, the first on 1 January and the second on the 14th of July.  The annual contingent has been limited to 60 commanders, 600 officers and 2,400 knights.

Award prerequisites are as follows:
Knight: be at least thirty years of age with fifteen years of service/work;
Officer: at least five years as a Member of the order;
Commander: at least five years as an Officer of the order.

Conditions of age and of seniority may be lowered for candidates who have outstanding qualifications.

A 5% contingency is allowed for people gaining direct entry into the order as officers or commanders for exceptional reasons.  Foreigners receiving the order are not subject to the seniority clause. Members of the Order of the Legion of Honour may be admitted to the Order of Agricultural Merit at the same rank they hold in the first.

An award certificate always accompanies the order.

Insignia
The Order of Agricultural Merit is in the form of a 40mm (35mm for pre November 1999) wide star, 60mm for the commander's insignia, with six white enamelled arms, the arms resting on a gilt wreath of wheat on the right and of corn on the left.  On the obverse at its center, a gilt medallion bearing the effigy of the republic in the form of the relief right profile of a woman's head, the medallion is surrounded by a narrow blue enamelled band bearing the golden semi circular inscription "RÉPUBLIQUE FRANÇAISE" ("FRENCH REPUBLIC").  On the reverse, the gilt medallion bears the relief inscription on three lines "MÉRITE" "AGRICOLE" "1883" ("AGRICULTURAL MERIT 1883"), it is surrounded by a plain blue enamelled band.

The officers' and commanders' badges also bear a gilt wreath, half vine and half olive branch, between the insignia and the ribbon suspension ring.

The knight's insignia is made of silver, the officer's is made of silver-gilt, the commander's is made of silver-gilt or gold.

The order hangs from a 37mm wide silk moiré green ribbon with 5mm amaranth vertical stripes located 1mm from the edges.  The commander's insignia is worn on a cravat around the neck.

Notable recipients

Commanders 
 Queen Anne, Queen Consort of Romania
Gerrit Braks
Princess Caroline, Princess of Hanover
King Charles III of the United Kingdom
Jean Dupuy
Jules Gravereaux
Jean-Paul Huchon
Christine Lagarde
Stéphane Le Foll
René Renou
Henri Stehlé

Officers 
Christian Bind
Michel Durodie
Dominique Levy
Ernest Vaux
Luu Meng
Pierre Galet
John C. H. Lee
Will Studd

Knights
Philippe Adnot
Yann Arthus-Bertrand
Florian Bellanger
Wina Born
Laura Calder
Priyam Chatterjee
Jean-Pierre Chessé
Jacques Chirac
Elizabeth David
Vasily Dokuchaev 
Alice Feiring
Patricia Gallagher
Thomas Harvey Gill
Henry S. Graves
Michel Guérard
Hermann Jaeger
Rita Jammet
Paul Jules Jourcin
Richard Juhlin
Eugène Leguen de Lacroix
Patrick Levaye
Bernard Loiseau
Kermit Lynch
Christian André Monchatre
Brian Morrissey
Thomas Volney Munson
Roland Passot
Louis Pasteur
Jacques Pépin
Paul Prudhomme
Thierry Rautureau
Jean Rochefort
Wolfram Siebeck
Lyle F. Watts
Jean Wiener 
Jon Winroth
Papa Abdoulaye Seck

Unknown rank
Jean Carmet
Catherine Deneuve
Paul Morand
Roger Peyrefitte 
Charles Semblat
Michel Serrault

See also

Ministry of Agriculture (France)
Order of Merit for Agriculture, Fisheries and Food

References

External links
 Décret n°59-729 du 15 juin 1959 RELATIF A L'ORDRE DU MERITE AGRICOLE
 Ministère de l'Agriculture, Ordre du Mérite Agricole official website  
 Site and forum on military and civil French orders and medals  
 
Museum of the Legion of Honour

Agriculture in France
Awards established in 1883
Civil awards and decorations of France
1883 establishments in France
 
Long service medals